János Szerényi (born 21 August 1938) is a Hungarian long-distance runner. He competed in the men's 10,000 metres at the 1968 Summer Olympics.

References

External links
 

1938 births
Living people
Athletes (track and field) at the 1968 Summer Olympics
Hungarian male long-distance runners
Olympic athletes of Hungary
Place of birth missing (living people)
20th-century Hungarian people